The 1991–92 Honduran Segunda División was the 25th season of the Honduran Segunda División.  Under the management of Jorge Rivera, Real Maya won the tournament after finishing first in the final round (or Hexagonal) and obtained promotion to the 1992–93 Honduran Liga Nacional.

Final round
Also known as Hexagonal.

Standings

Known results

References

Segunda
1991